Berbenno is a comune (municipality) in the Province of Bergamo in the Italian region of Lombardy, located about  northeast of Milan and about  northwest of Bergamo.

Berbenno borders the following municipalities: Bedulita, Brembilla, Capizzone, Sant'Omobono Terme.

Twin towns — sister cities
Berbenno is twinned with:

  Saint-Laurent-du-Pont, France, since 1985

References

External links
 Official website